

The Ahrens AR 404 was a prototype American civil transport aircraft first flown in 1976, a high-wing monoplane powered by four turboprop engines. In order to facilitate the loading and unloading of cargo, the fuselage was of constant rectangular section along almost its entire length, the main undercarriage was retracted into sponsons on the fuselage sides, and the tail included a loading ramp. As a regional airliner, the AR 404 was designed to carry 30 passengers, or in its cargo configuration, to accommodate four standard D3 freight containers.

Ahrens secured a production deal with the government of Puerto Rico, which agreed to finance the type certification of the aircraft if Ahrens would establish its production facilities there. The first production aircraft was built and flown there on October 26, 1979, but no more were constructed after financing was withdrawn.

Specifications

See also

References

 
 

AR 404
1970s United States airliners
1970s United States cargo aircraft
Four-engined tractor aircraft
High-wing aircraft
Four-engined turboprop aircraft
Abandoned civil aircraft projects of the United States
Aircraft first flown in 1976